Alectorius can refer to:
 Johannes Galliculus, a medieval German music theorist and composer
 Lapis alectorius, an occult stone